Goathland is a village  and civil parish in the Scarborough district of North Yorkshire, England. Historically part of the North Riding of Yorkshire, it is in the North York Moors national park due north of Pickering, off the A169 to Whitby. It has a station on the steam-operated North Yorkshire Moors Railway line.

According to the 2011 UK census, Goathland parish had a population of 438, an increase of 31 on the 2001 UK census figure of 407. In 2015, North Yorkshire County Council estimated the population to be 430.

History

The name Goathland is probably a corruption of 'good land'. Alternatively it may come from 'Goda's land', Goda being an Old English personal name. In 1109 King Henry I granted land to Osmund the Priest and the brethren of the hermitage of Goathland, then called Godelandia, for the soul of his mother, Queen Matilda, who had died in 1083. This is recorded in a charter held at Whitby Abbey. The village was a spa town in the 19th century. There are several hotels and guest houses in the village. The largest, the Mallyan Spout Hotel, is named after a nearby waterfall. There is a caravan site, reached by driving along the track that was the route of the railway from 1835 to 1860. The route of the original railway passed by the Goathland Hotel, which acted as a local transport hub until the railway was shifted further east to the newer  station.

Much of the surrounding land is owned by the Duchy of Lancaster. The Duchy's tenants have a common right extending for hundreds of years to graze their black faced sheep on the village green and surrounding moorland.

The grade II* listed Church of St Mary, was built between 1894 and 1896. However, a chapel has existed in Goathland since at least 1521, being supplanted by a church in 1821. Stone and other materials from the 1821 church were re-used for other buildings in the village. At that time, dressed stone was quarried locally and was in short supply, this being 15 years before the railway arrived in the village. The war memorial, made from sandstone and modelled on the nearby Lilla Cross, is located on the village green. It was grade II listed in November 2021, just before that year's Remembrance Sunday services.

The village has a primary school, with a capacity of 49 pupils. The school was rated as good by Ofsted in 2013. The village had a library until 1966, and this was resurrected as a volunteer library and community hub in 2019, which is run from the village hall.

The Goathland Plough Stots, a troop which performs a Long Sword dance, are based in the village. Every Plough Monday, the Plough Stots perform in the village and surrounding area raising money for local hospitals.

Heartbeat connection 

The village was the setting of the fictional village of Aidensfield in the Heartbeat television series set in the 1960s. Many landmarks from the series are recognisable, including the shop, garage/funeral directors, the public house and the railway station. The pub is called the Goathland Hotel but in the series is The Aidensfield Arms. After interior shots were filmed in the hotel for some years, a replica of it was built in Yorkshire TV's Leeds studio.

Transport
The first railway station in Goathland was located at the top of an incline. The station, was located in the village, and the carriages were drawn up the incline by the use of a rope-worked drum system. This closed to regular passenger traffic in 1965, and was re-opened as part of the North Yorkshire Moors Railway in 1973.

North Yorkshire Moors Railway 
Goathland railway station is on the North Yorkshire Moors Railway. The railway is run by a charitable trust with some paid staff but is mostly operated by volunteers and runs nearly all year including Christmas. It carries more than 250,000 passengers a year and is the second-longest preserved line in Britain. It links Grosmont in the north with Pickering in the south along the route of the Whitby - Pickering line built by George Stephenson in 1835 and upgraded in 1865.  From 2007 some trains on the railway were timetabled to run to Whitby and in March 2014 work began in Whitby station to replace a platform and allow more North Yorkshire Moors Railway services to be timetabled between Whitby and Pickering.

Goathland railway station was used as the location for Hogsmeade railway station in the Harry Potter films and the line filmed for Harry's journey. It was also used in the 1995 film Carrington.

Appearance in literature
As well as serving as the location for the fictional village of Aidensfield, Goathland features in its own right as the setting for the denouement of Dan Chapman's 2014 dystopian thriller Closed Circuit. It is explained that the antagonist owns the entire village and the nearby MoD site serves as a base for his operations.

Goathland also features in ‘Ice’, a novel by Australian writer Louis Nowra (Allen & Unwin, 2008).
Malcolm Saville's children's novel Mystery Mine'' is set in an area south-west of Whitby on the north-east Yorkshire moors close to and around a village called Goathland. The book contains two maps showing the layout of a partly fictional geography of the area in which the book is set but Goathland, Wheeldale Moor and the Roman Road referred to in the book correspond to the real locations in this area south of Eskdale.

Sport 
Goathland Cricket Club has a history dating back to 1874, when it was known as the 'Vale of Goathland Cricket Club'. The club moved to their current ground on Centenary Cricket Field in 1876. Goathland have two senior teams: a Saturday 1st XI that compete in the Scarborough Beckett Cricket League and a Midweek Senior XI in the Esk Valley Evening League.

References

Sources

External links

Photographs and information on Goathland
Goathland photo galleries at website of Glendale House, Goathland
Heartbeat on ITV

Villages in North Yorkshire
Civil parishes in North Yorkshire